Louis-Amadeo Brihier Lacroix, alias Émile Dubois (29 April 1867–26 March 1907) was a French-born criminal and serial killer known as a folk hero in Chile.

Early life
Louis-Amadeo Brihier Lacroix (Aka Émile Dubois), son of Joseph Brihier and Marie Lacroix, killed the father of his girlfriend, a retired policeman, when he was fifteen. He then worked as miner for two years, until a foreman was found dead. After two months in prison for theft, he embarked for Venezuela at the age of twenty taking the name Émile Dubois. In 1903, aided by his two lovers Ursula Morales and her friend Catalina, he murdered a young Peruvian engineer in a trap laid in a brothel in Ouro, stealing the young man's savings.

Murder of Ernesto Lafontaine
Dubois' first recorded murder in Chile was that of Ernesto Lafontaine in Santiago. Lafontaine's mutilated body was found by Roman Díaz, an alderman and personal friend of the victim, at the office desk that he had on Huérfanos street. Among other belongings, a gold watch, the keys to a safe and cash were missing. Eventually, this gold watch would be crucial evidence to establish Dubois' guilt in his trial in Valparaíso.

The murders in Valparaíso
Then in Valparaíso followed more murders; Gustave Titius, a German businessman, Isidore Challe, another French merchant, and Reinald Tillmans, a German trader.

On June 26, 1905, he attempted to murder an English dentist called Charles Davies, the attack failed and he fled and was pursued and caught by crowds. It was in Valparaíso where Dubois was captured, tried and finally executed by four riflemen on March 26, 1907.

Popular legend
According to the chroniclers of the time, the victims of Dubois were usurers, so that the people termed him the Chilean Robin Hood, considering the murders as acts of justice of the proletariat against the bourgeoisie. Popular culture has since elevated him to the status of folk saint, transforming his grave (located in the Playa Ancha in Valparaiso) into a revered one, full of innumerable gifts and dedications.

Fiction
The history of Émile Dubois and his enigmatic personality are treated in the novel All those deaths (1971) by Carlos Droguett, who won the Alfaguara prize that year.

It was also published in The Private Life of Émile Dubois by Chilean singer and writer Patricio Manns, who worked to reinterpret, revise and deepen the character of Droguett's novel.

Biographies
There are at least two biographies of Émile Dubois, both published in 1907, the year of his execution. However, the improbability of the narrated facts, the total discordance between the two and the anonymity of the authors (in the case of the first one it is an alias and in the second the authors claimed to have transcribed a manuscript that arrived anonymously to them) it is presumable that both are apocryphal. These biographies are the following:
 Emile Dubois: Relación Verídica de sus crímenes y aventuras, Imprenta y litografía Universo, Valparaíso, 1907 by Inocencio del Campo
 La verdadera historia de Dubois: las memorias del célebre criminal: su vida en Francia, Inglaterra, Venezuela, Perú, Bolivia y Chile: sus compañeras Ursula y Elcira, Santiago de Chile, 1907 by E. Tagle M. and C. Morales F.

See also
List of serial killers by country

References

External links
The Enigmatic murderer of Valaparaíso in escaner.cl
Émile Dubois, the story that created the myth in Culturart.cl
Crime does not pay | Dubois became a legend... (The Fourth)

1867 births
1907 deaths
20th-century executions by Chile
Chilean serial killers
French emigrants to Chile
French people executed abroad
Executed Chilean people
Executed French people
Executed French serial killers
Executed people from Nord-Pas-de-Calais
Male serial killers
People executed by Chile by firing squad
People executed for murder
People from Pas-de-Calais